"Nothin' Less Than Love" is a song written by Wayne Tester and Rusty Young. It was originally recorded by American country music artist Bryan White on his 1994 self-titled album.  It was later recorded by American country music group The Buffalo Club.  It was released in June 1997 as the second single from the album The Buffalo Club.  The song reached #26 on the Billboard Hot Country Singles & Tracks chart.

Critical reception
A review of the single in Billboard was favorable, stating that the song "is marked by soaring vocals, a strong pop hook, and a well-crafted lyric."

Chart performance

References

1997 singles
1994 songs
Bryan White songs
The Buffalo Club songs
Song recordings produced by Barry Beckett
Songs written by Rusty Young (musician)
Songs written by Wayne Tester